Birinchi May is a village in the Chüy Region of Kyrgyzstan. It is part of the Panfilov District. Its population was 1,722 in 2021. It was established in 1933.

References

Populated places in Chüy Region